I Do may refer to:

 "I do", a phrase used in some marriage vows; used by brides and grooms in response to questions posed by either the officiant or the other marriage partner

Film and TV

Film
 I Do (1921 film), a silent comedic short film starring Harold Lloyd
 I Do (2000 film), a Hong Kong film starring Ella Koon
 I Do (2006 film) (Prête-moi ta main), a French romantic comedy
 I Do (2010 film), a Philippine film starring Enchong Dee & Erich Gonzales
 I Do (2012 American film), an American film directed by Glenn Gaylord
 I Do (2012 Chinese film), a Chinese film directed by Zhou Sun
 I Do (But I Don't), a 2004 TV romantic comedy

Television 
 "I Do (TV series)", a Philippine reality television show on ABS-CBN
 I Do?, a Taiwanese drama series on TVBS Joy Channel
 "I Do" (Glee), an episode of Glee
 "I Do" (Lost), an episode of Lost
 "I Do", an episode of ER (season 12)
 "I Do", an episode of Rugrats
 "I Do, I Do", an episode of The New Adventures of Wonder Woman

Music

Songs 
 "I Do" (Arvingarna song)
 "I Do" (Blaque song)
 "I Do" (Cardi B song)
 "I Do" (The Castells song)
 "I Do" (Colbie Caillat song), 2011
 "I Do" (Fabrizio Faniello song)
 "I Do" (Fleetwood Mac song)
 "I Do" (Gin Wigmore song)
 "I Do" (Jamelia song)
 "I Do" (Jessie James Decker song)
 "I Do" (Jewel song)
 "I Do" (Lisa Loeb song)
 "I Do" (Morgan Evans song)
 "I Do" (Nina Girado song)
 "I Do" (Paul Brandt song)
 "I Do" (Rain song)
 "I Do" (Young Jeezy song)
 "I Do (Cherish You)", a song by Mark Wills, also covered by 98 Degrees
 "I Do (Wanna Get Close to You)", a song by 3LW
 "I Do!!", a song by Toya
 "I Do", a song by Anastacia from Anastacia
 "I Do", a song by Chingy from Powerballin'
 "I Do", a song by Edie Brickell & New Bohemians from Shooting Rubberbands at the Stars
 "I Do", a song by Ivy Queen from Drama Queen
 "I Do", a song by Jude
 "I Do", a song by Lil Jon from Crunk Rock
 "I Do", a song by The Marvelows
 "I Do", a song by Paul Heaton from The Cross Eyed Rambler
 "I Do", a song by Paul McCartney from "Driving Rain"
 "I Do", a song by Pedro the Lion from Achilles Heel
 "I Do", a song by Placebo from Once More With Feeling
 "I Do", a song by Uncle Kracker from No Stranger to Shame
 "I Do", a song by Weezer, a B-side of the single "Hash Pipe"
 "I Do", a song by Westlife from Back Home
 "I Do (Whatcha Say Boo)", a song by Jon B. from Cool Relax

See also 
 "I Do Do", an episode of the American TV series 30 Rock
 I Do, I Do (disambiguation)
 "I Do, I Do, I Do, I Do, I Do", a song by the Swedish band ABBA
 I Do Now I Don't, e-commerce website
 
 Sony Ericsson Idou or Sony Ericsson Satio, a smartphone